Ventrell Miller (born January 15, 1999) is an American football linebacker for the Florida Gators.

Early years
Miller attended Kathleen High School in Lakeland, Florida. He had 50 tackles his senior year and 104 his junior year. He committed to the University of Florida to play college football.

College career
Miller was suspended, along with eight other players, his first year at Florida in 2017 due to felony fraud charges. He returned from the suspension in 2018 and appeared in all 13 games recording 15 tackles, one sack and one interception which he returned 82 yards for a touchdown. Miller became a starter his sophomore year in 2019, starting 11 of 12 games and finishing with 55 tackles and three sacks. He returned as a starter his junior year in 2020.

References

External links
Florida Gators bio

Living people
Sportspeople from Lakeland, Florida
Players of American football from Florida
American football linebackers
Florida Gators football players
African-American players of American football
1999 births
21st-century African-American sportspeople